"Dealer's Choice" is the third segment of the eighth episode of the first season (1985–86) of the television series The Twilight Zone. Featuring an ensemble cast composed largely of veteran character actors, it follows the events of a poker night in which one of the players is secretly the Devil.

Plot
A group of friends are having a poker night. Regulars Tony, Marty, Jake, and Peter are joined by Nick, who is subbing for their friend Norman. After many hands won by Nick, Jake begins to ponder why he is dealt so many sixes. While Nick and Marty are away from the table, Jake confirms that Nick's current hand has three sixes. The guys become convinced that Nick is the Devil when they call Norman and discover he isn't sick.

When Nick rejoins the table, he admits that they are right and apologizes for the deception. He also informs them that one of them is to die and go to Hell tonight. The three friends debate who it is to be collected. At Nick's suggestion, they draw to determine who it is, and Pete "wins". Tony argues that in order to be fair, Pete should get to play Nick for the fate of his soul. Nick puts up nineteen dollars against Pete's soul. After being allowed the right of dealer's choice, Pete chooses lowball, where the worst hand wins, anticipating that Nick's tendency to draw sixes will practically guarantee he gets three of a kind or higher.

Marty rejoins the group. Nick indeed draws three sixes, but Pete draws four fives, leaving Nick drawing a fourth six as Pete's only path to victory. Nick turns over his last card. It is a Death Tarot card. Before the Devil can take Pete, however, Marty touches the Death card, failing to understand what it signifies. Because of Marty's innocence, the card reveals itself to be a fourth six, which Nick had concealed under an illusion to avoid losing. To make amends for this cheating, Nick leaves them a grand feast along with a refrigerator filled with beer. The Devil leaves, thanking Pete for his hospitality and says he hopes to host the next game, insinuating that he plans for all of them to end up in Hell. As the friends start another poker hand, they resolve to be better husbands to their wives and start going to church regularly.

Production
The director, Wes Craven, found "Dealer's Choice" very difficult to make, since the poker table setting made figuring out the right angle to shoot the action from an ongoing challenge, and he had no experience in working with that sort of setting.

References

External links
 

1985 American television episodes
The Twilight Zone (1985 TV series season 1) episodes
Fiction about the Devil